Sentimentalist Magazine was an American magazine of indie rock music and culture, which was published quarterly.

History
Launched in New York City, New York, in 2000 or earlier as The Sentimentalist, it changed its title to The Sentimentalist Magazine with Issue 14, and then dropped the definite article from Issue 16. As of January 2008, the magazine had been relaunched as an online-only publication. It continued for several years to publish "magazine covers" with each monthly online issue. The site has not been updated since 2015.

Sentimentalist Magazine was started as an indie music and culture print magazine. It was voted as PLUG Awards nominee in the Media (obsessive) category "Zine of the Year" in 2007, and again in 2008.

As of January 2008, Sentimentalist Magazine was relaunched as an online-only magazine. The magazine's mission is to give indie bands from around the world the exposure they might not have otherwise encountered.

Sentimentalist Magazines editor was Madeline Virbasius-Walsh.

See also

 List of music magazines

References

External links
 

2001 establishments in New York City
2008 disestablishments in the United States
Online music magazines published in the United States
Quarterly magazines published in the United States
Defunct magazines published in the United States
Indie rock
Magazines established in 2001
Magazines disestablished in 2008
Magazines published in New York City
Online magazines with defunct print editions